The 1970–71 Segunda División was the 22nd season of the Mexican Segunda División. The season started on 19 December 1970 and concluded on 8 August 1971. It was won by San Luis, which was the first team to win the Segunda división one year after being promoted from Tercera División.

Changes 
 Zacatepec and Puebla were promoted to Primera División.
 Zapata was relegated from Segunda División.
 San Luis, Atlético Cuernavaca, Cuautla, Querétaro and Universidad Veracruzana were promoted from Tercera División.
 Celaya and C.D. Poza Rica were dissolved.

Teams

League table

Results

References 

1970–71 in Mexican football
Segunda División de México seasons